The BMW 117 was a piston aircraft engine developed by BMW in the 1930s. Development work stopped in 1937. The BMW 117 engine was initially known as the BMW XV.

Specifications (BMW 117)

See also

References

Bibliography

BMW aircraft engines
1930s aircraft piston engines